The 2017 Nokere Koerse was the 72nd edition of the Nokere Koerse road cycling one day race. It was held on 15 March 2017 as part of the UCI Europe Tour in category 1.HC.

Teams
Twenty-three teams of up to eight riders started the race:

Result

References 

Nokere Koerse
Nokere Koerse
Nokere Koerse